Mazıx (also, Matsex, Matsekh, and Mazykh) is a village and municipality in the Zaqatala Rayon of Azerbaijan. It has a population of 1,796.  The municipality consists of the villages of Mazıx, Qəbizdərə and Çiçibinə.

References

External links

Populated places in Zaqatala District